The men's middleweight (75 kg/165 lbs) K-1 category at the W.A.K.O. World Championships 2007 in Belgrade was the fifth heaviest of the K-1 tournaments, involving seventeen fighters all based in Europe.  Each of the matches was three rounds of two minutes each and were fought under K-1 rules.

As there were too few contestants for a thirty-two man tournament, fifteen of the fighters received a bye through to the second round.  The tournament champion was Belarusian Yury Harbachou who defeated Frenchman Kamel Metzani in the final to win gold.  Defeated semi finalists Macedonian Ile Risteski and José Reis from Portugal won bronze.

Results

See also
List of WAKO Amateur World Championships
List of WAKO Amateur European Championships
List of male kickboxers

References

External links
 WAKO World Association of Kickboxing Organizations Official Site

Kickboxing events at the WAKO World Championships 2007 Belgrade
2007 in kickboxing
Kickboxing in Serbia